Roy Mitchell may refer to:

 Roy Mitchell (baseball) (1885–1959), American baseball player
 Roy Mitchell-Cárdenas (born 1977), Mexican-American musician and author
 Roy Mitchell (ice hockey) (born 1969), retired Canadian ice hockey player
 Roy Mitchell (long jumper) (born 1955), British former long jumper
 Roy Mitchell (sailor) (1913–1968), British Olympic sailor
 Roy Mitchell (theatre practitioner) (1884–1944), Canadian-American theatre practitioner
 Roy Mitchell, African-American man convicted of murder, and executed in 1923, see Execution of Roy Mitchell